Van Noort is a Dutch toponymic surname meaning "from (the) north". Among variant forms are Noort, Van de Noort, and Van Noordt. Before 1811 the spellings "Noordt" and "Noort" were interchangeable. People with this name include:

Aat van Noort (1908–1998), Dutch middle-distance runner
Adam van Noort (1561/62–1641), Flemish painter and draughtsman, son of Lambert
Anthoni van Noordt (c.1619–1675), Dutch composer and organist, nephew of Sybrandt
Ginie Van De Noort (born 1979), French journalist and television presenter
Jan van Noordt (1623–1681), Dutch  landscape, portrait and allegory painter
Joël van Noort (born 1980s), Dutch Rubik's Cube speedsolver
Lambert van Noort (1520–1571), Dutch painter and architect active in Antwerp, father of Adam
Olivier van Noort (1558–1627), Dutch merchant captain and the first Dutchman to circumnavigate the world
Peter van der Noort (born 1974), Dutch rower
Pieter van Noort (1622–1672), Dutch still life painter
Roald van Noort (born 1960), Dutch water polo player
Robert Van de Noort, Dutch historian and archaeologist
 (1659–1705), Dutch composer and keyboardist

See also
Noort, surname
Van Oort

References

Dutch-language surnames
Toponymic surnames